Some of Stan Lee Media's most important projects included the animated web series 7th Portal (where Stan Lee himself voiced the character Izayus), The Drifter, and The Accuser. The 7th Portal characters were licensed to an interactive 3-D movie attraction in four Paramount theme parks.

During Chapter 11 debtor in possession proceedings following the company's bankruptcy, Stan Lee assigned the major character franchises he created to his new public company POW! Entertainment without the knowledge or approval of the Bankruptcy court. Courts later determined that Lee and his new partner Arthur Lieberman failed to disclose the existence and value of the Rights Assignment Lee made to the company when he founded it.

The 7th Portal 
The 7th Portal, created by Stan Lee to launch his vision of the next universe of Super-Heroes in the digital age  became the first ever web animation series to succeed as a 3D ride attraction and to be developed for a $150 million movie by Paramount with producer Mark Canton. 

The 7th Portal premiered on the new animation hub Shockwave, on February 29, 2000, when its global launch overwhelmed Macromedia's servers. It became the most successful web originated animated series, being picked up by Fox in mid run, for distribution on TV in South America and Europe. Twenty-two episodes were made, of which the first twenty were shown on-line before the website went bankrupt. The final two episodes were only visible on television.

Main plot

The 7th Portal told the story of Izayus when he approaches a young beta tester named Peter Littlecloud. He claims to have a game that will let him and his friends fight real monsters, which he projects holographically using the CD-ROM he claims contains the game. The game's premise is that there are six other dimensions, all of which have been conquered by the evil Lord Mongorr (who was Izayus's brother). The players need to take the form of a superhero in order to stop him from opening the portal to the seventh universe, their own.

After they have chosen their form, Peter, Roberto, and Greta are sucked into the computer screen, wherein time they learn that they've been transported for real into the parallel universe of Darkmoor. Also, they have been transformed into their superhero forms. Peter is the Thunderer, Roberto is Oxblood, and Greta is Gossamer. Despite their impressive powers, the heroes find that their forms are still subject to the rules of the game such as spending Life Points to use their superpowers. They are eventually captured by the Nullifiers (a name given to Mongorr's select group of minion) members Vultura and Krog and brought to The Bloodzone, a gladiator-like arena consisting of floating platforms over a spiked pit. 

Meanwhile, Rikio, Ozubo, and Anna are confused by their friends' disappearance. Suddenly, they are transported into cyberspace to meet Izayus. He reveals to them that the CD was actually the half of The Artifact, a mysterious device that grants unlimited power to the one who gathers the two pieces. Izayus has the red half, which symbolizes life and allows transportation between Earth and Darkmoor; while Mongorr has the blue half which symbolizes death and kills anyone who touches it without the red half. Izayus uses the Artifact's red half to transform Rikio, Ozubo, and Anna into their respective superhero forms, The Streak, Conjure Man, and Imitatia.

Thunderer, Oxblood, and Gossamer discover that they must fight the Nullifiers members Bearhug and Mongorr's daughter Vendetta to the death if they want to leave the Bloodzone. When Thunderer loses all his Life Points transforming back into Peter, Izayus appears and heals Gossamer. After Izayus was impaled by the Nullifier Whipsaw, Mongorr attacked Whipsaw and healed Izayus upon his capture while the Data Raiders escape with The Artifact. The Nullifiers try to stop them when the heroes are saved by The Streak, Conjure Man and Imitatia.

The heroes take the name Data Raiders for themselves and hide in a basement. A fight breaks out among them because Peter had transferred Oxblood's Life Points to his own so that he could transform into Thunderer again. This left Oxblood at zero points and transformed him back into Roberto at the cost of his scanner which is crushed by Krog during battle. Roberto knocks Thunderer and leaves. Knocked out, Thunderer reverts into Peter. The others notice that Peter's Life Potins are increasing, and hypothesize that if they get something to eat they'll be able to increase their Life Points even faster. Roberto is captured by the Nullifiers where Vendetta used him as mind-controlled bait to capture the Data Raiders. When the Data Raiders return with the food, they are attacked by the Nullifiers and are forced to surrender. With the assembled Artifact, Mongorr sends the Data Raiders back to Earth, stripping them of their powers.

Shortly afterward, he proceeds to send an army through it to destroy several of the Earth's landmarks. However, Izayus sends some of his energy through the portal, returning the Data Raiders' powers to full strength (and even restoring Roberto's scanner), and they return through the portal. The Data Raider free Izayus and defeat the Nullifiers. Izayus then destroys Mongorr and claims the Artifact using it to repair all the damage Mongorr has caused to the multiverse for in Izayus's words, "it will be as if Mongorr never existed." As a reward, the Data Raiders get to keep their powers and return to Earth. The series ends with Izayus saying that Earth and the 7th Portal will always need heroes such as the Data Raiders.

Characters

The Drifter

The Drifter was created by Stan Lee and co-developed by Steve Gerber and Taylor Grant. The story revolved around a character called "The Drifter" who can travel through time with the aid of a device called the decoder (which resembled a black semisphere with colored buttons). Viewers of the series were called true believers. 

A series of twelve animated webisodes were set to stream Sci-Fi's website in 2001, though only one saw release. In late 2000, a revamped live action version of the concept was created, based on the characters but notably different in its story. Discussions with Sci-Fi/USA were ongoing to create the series for television, however, the collapse of Stan Lee Media shelved the project. At the time, fan response to a detailed preview on IGN Filmforce was notable; though, the series was never to surface again.

The Backstreet Project

Main plot

The story depicts a reality where the Backstreet Boys are superheroes called the Cyber Crusaders.

Characters

The Accuser

The Accuser was created by Stan Lee and co-developed by Roy Johansen, Taylor Grant and Steve Gerber. It starred a character who took justice into his own hands. The Accuser is a science-fiction series starring Richard Clarkin as Dan Mason, Jason Barr as the Corporal, Ray Landry as the Doctor Tony Daniels as the Fullbright, Lawrence Bayne as Charlie Johnson Savitch and Susan Roman as Fore.

Plot
At the first chapter starts, we see a recently hospitalized Dan Mason recalling his past as the best criminal defense attorney money could buy. He usually didn't care about whose money was buying him and taught himself not to know what his clients do after being acquitted. At the cost of his own wife Lucia, Dan learns the underworld's gratitude isn't long-lasting.

One of his clients (upset that he agreed to defend Lucas Cortex) tried to have him killed. As a result, Dan is now a full-time wheelchair-using widower. In the hospital, Dan said he'd give his soul in exchange for a chance to bring justice. A mysterious entity accepts the deal and gives Dan a special wheelchair that can be converted into a special armor that will move his legs for him. What Dan doesn't know is that his mysterious benefactor is evaluating him for some unknown agenda.

Other projects
Other productions included the Evil Clone —a purported attempt to clone Stan Lee as a cartoon that wackily criticized many aspects of the media, including happy endings, the StanLeeMedia.net website—, and The Backstreet Project, a project including the Backstreet Boys. Different editions on The Backstreet Project comic books were released on the market. Six webisodes were also released in 1999 via StanLeeMedia.net.

References

Lists of animated internet series
Stan Lee